The Astrogators Chartbook is a 1980 role-playing game supplement for Traveller published by Judges Guild.

Contents
The Astrogators Chartbook includes three sets of mapping grids and a solar system display, all in black on heavy paper.

Publication history
The Astrogators Chartbook was published in 1980 by Judges Guild as a 96-page book.

Reception
Richard A. Edwards reviewed The Astrogators Chartbook in The Space Gamer No. 38. Edwards commented that "Considering the cost of photocopying all these maps out of a friend's copy, it is worth buying the book. The types of grids picked for inclusion are the most current in Traveller usage. It is a must for all Traveller referees."

References

Judges Guild publications
Role-playing game supplements introduced in 1980
Traveller (role-playing game) supplements